Mohammad Shahnawaz Choudhary is an Indian political activist. Till 2014 he was President of J&K Pradesh Youth Congress and later General Secretary of the Jammu & Kashmir Pradesh Congress Committee. currently he is a DDC member of Surankote A constituency. He defeated Choudhary Mohd Akram ( ex MLA Surankote) by 2675 votes. He raise his voice at different platforms for the welfare of poonch district people. He was the first elected President of the J&K Pradesh Youth Congress. He joined course B.A L.L.B at The law school, University of Jammu.

Political activity
In  2009, Choudhary was appointed All India General Secretary of the National Students Union of India and oversaw its activities in Delhi and North Eastern States. He was selected for this position through a national talent hunt in which the best leaders amongst the students of India were selected He also led the protest against the attacks on Indian students in Australia and gheraoed the Embassy of Australia in New Delhi  In August, 2010, he was appointed as National Secretary All India Youth Congress. He remained in charge of various states in India as the National Secretary of Youth Congress

Choudhary led a Statewide protest against Jammu & Kashmir National Conference led State Government for non implementation of 73rd and 74th Amendments to the Constitution of India for the empowerment of Pachayats in J&K.  During his tenure as National General Secretary NSUI, he led mass rally in Delhi University against Ragging. He also started helpline for the students who are victims of ragging,  "Our helpline will provide moral support to the victims of ragging. And their complaints will be tackled with utmost immediacy, since as of now, it takes time," said Mohd Shahnawaz, NSUI's National General Secretary while leading the campaign 
Choudhary also started his rural connect campaign "Jan Chetna Yatra", soon after taking charge as the first elected state president of youth congress, and visited almost every village in the state of J&K. During his campaign he made aware the farmers and other stake holders about the policies and programs of the government and also criticised the anti-people acts of the state government.

During his presidency, he introduced the culture of public durbars and public meetings in order to bridge the gap between the government and its people. He tried to be the medium through which people can be benefited from the policies of the government and at the same time, the bad acts of the concerned government can be criticised 
In 2014 he visited flood-damaged areas in Surankote and distributed relief supplies.  He was later appointed as the Convener of the campaign committee of Indian National Congress for the Jammu & Kashmir Pradesh Assembly elections that year.

In March 2015, he led a protest against the release from prison of separatist leader Masarat Alam.
  Later that year, in Srinagar, representing the Congress, he addressed a crowd at a protest against evacuations of forest residents in the area.
Choudhary has a significant fan following due to his charismatic youth leadership in India and receives welcomes and receptions throughout the state.
In the recent Bihar state assembly elections, he was appointed as the coordinator for AICC (All India Congress Committee) and worth to mention that INC secured the best results in the elections. He was appointed as Coordinator for Demonetization campaign in Chhattisgarh. He also worked as Incharge secretary, IYC in Uttar Pradesh and Odisha.

He is also the Founder President of Society For Justice, Awareness and Deliverance (NGO), State President of All J&K  Gujjar & Bakerwal students, Co-ordinator of YAKJAH (J&K), General Secretary of National Progressive Youth Organization (NGO). He was Elected General Secretary of Students Advocates Council of The Law School, JU and Elected Cultural Secretary of Jammu University.

He participated in GoI Youth Delegation visit to China in 2012 as youth congress delegate. He also organized 4 Days National Executive of IYC at Srinagar in 2012, first of its kind in the history of J&K in Kashmir region. He was declared as Best State Level Debater by State Institute of Education, J&K.

References

Living people
1984 births
Activists from Jammu and Kashmir
University of Jammu alumni
Aligarh Muslim University alumni